Wayna Potosí (Aymara and Quechua wayna young, Hispanicized spelling Huayna Potosí) is a mountain in the Andes of Bolivia, about 4,969 metres (16,302 ft) high. It is located in the Oruro Department, Sajama Province, Turku Municipality, Turku Canton, northwest of Turku (Turco). The Turku River originates near the mountain. It is a left tributary of the Lauca River.

See also
 Asu Asuni
 Kunturiri
 Sajama 
 Sajama National Park
 List of mountains in the Andes

References 

Mountains of Oruro Department